Knitsley is a hamlet in County Durham, in England. The name derives from Old English and means the meadow where knights were.

It is situated a short distance to the south of the town of Consett. There is a pub (some way outside of the village) called The Old Mill. A telephone box once existed at the end of Hownsgill drive but this was removed many years ago due to lack of use. A railway station existed until 1964 when cutbacks in the railway system dramatically reduced rail services in Britain.

References

External links

 Subterranea Britannica entry on Knitsley Railway Station

Hamlets in County Durham